Paul Maximilian Heinrich Schneider von Esleben (28 August 1915 – 19 May 2005), known as Paul Schneider-Esleben, was a German architect.

Early life
Paul Schneider-Esleben was born in 1915 in Düsseldorf to Elisabeth and Franz Schneider-Esleben, an architect. Before completing his secondary school Abitur, he worked at his father's architectural practice and went on to study architecture at the University of Applied Sciences Stuttgart in 1937. He graduated in 1947; from 1939 to 1945 he suspended his studies to participate in the Second World War.

Career
Schneider-Esleben opened an architectural firm in Düsseldorf in 1949. His early designs, including the —a multi-storey carpark constructed in 1951, and the building that made him famous—followed the principles of the New Objectivity movement of the 1920s. From 1962 to 1970 he oversaw the redesign of the Cologne Bonn Airport into a layout that was adopted by numerous other international airports and led to his being hired as a consultant to architectural projects for many worldwide airports.

Schneider-Esleben was a professor at the Hochschule für bildende Künste Hamburg from 1961 until 1972 as well as a visiting professor of the Vienna University of Technology in 1965. He was also a furniture designer, and often created specific furniture designs for his buildings, such as the "PSE 58" chair.

Schneider-Esleben's work slowed in the 1970s as his modernist style became outdated in favour of postmodernism. He died in Tegernsee in 2005, aged 89.

Recognition and impact
Schneider-Esleben is credited as an influential figure in the post-World War II modernist architectural movement in Germany. An obituary published by Deutschlandfunk described him as a pioneer of modern architecture. He received the North Rhine-Westphalia State Prize for Architecture in 1956, the Order of Merit of the Federal Republic of Germany in 1968 and 1987, and an honorary doctorate from RWTH Aachen University in 1993.

In 2015, a retrospective of Schneider-Esleben's work was exhibited at the Architekturmuseum der Technischen Universität München, as part of the Pinakothek der Moderne in Munich. The exhibition marked the centenary of his birth.

Family
He was the father of Florian Schneider, one of the founding members of electronic music pioneers Kraftwerk.

References

External links
  (in German)

1915 births
2005 deaths
20th-century German architects
Modernist architects from Germany
People from Düsseldorf
Academic staff of the University of Fine Arts of Hamburg
Commanders Crosses of the Order of Merit of the Federal Republic of Germany
Architects from North Rhine-Westphalia
German military personnel of World War II